Jeppo may refer to:
 Jeppo (village), a settlement in Finland
 a soubriquet for people with the name Jepson
 Carly Rae Jepsen (b. 1985), Canadian singer